Lydia Aran (October 1921 – March 5, 2013 in Jerusalem), was a professor emerita at the Hebrew University of Jerusalem and a scholar of Buddhism. She taught in the Hebrew University's Department of Indian Studies until her retirement in 1998.

Aran was born in Vilnius, Lithuania, where she survived the Holocaust by being hidden, with her twin sister, in the small village of Ignalina by her high school history teacher, Krystyna Adolph, an ethnically Polish Catholic.

Books
 The Art of Nepal
 Buddhism: An Introduction to Buddhist Philosophy and Religion (Hebrew) 1993
 Destroying a Civilization: Tibet 1950-2000 (Hebrew) 2007

References

Academic staff of the Hebrew University of Jerusalem
Holocaust survivors
Lithuanian Jews
Lithuanian emigrants to Israel
Writers from Vilnius
2013 deaths
1921 births
Lithuanian women writers